Charlie Parker Memorial, Vol. 1 is an LP record by Charlie Parker, released posthumously by Savoy Records. Several tracks on this album had been previously released on other formats (78 rpm records, 7 inch EPs and 10 inch LPs), but is the first 12-inch release of these master takes. It contains selections from four sessions recorded in 1947 and 1948, and contains several previously unreleased alternate takes from these sessions.

Background
Charlie Parker recorded seven studio sessions for Savoy Records between 1944 and 1948; five as a leader, two as a sideman. Twenty-nine tracks from these sessions were released by Savoy on 78 rpm records. Twenty-seven of these tracks were reissued on 7 inch EPs and 10 inch LPs under Parker's name (the other two tracks featuring vocals by guitarist Tiny Grimes). The longer playing 12 inch LP became popular in the mid-1950s and Savoy inaugurated its 12-inch LP series with two albums (this album, and The Immortal Charlie Parker [Savoy MG 12001]) which reissued previously released master takes along with previously unreleased alternate takes. Savoy released three more 12 inch albums (Charlie Parker Memorial, Vol. 2 [Savoy MG 12009], The Genius of Charlie Parker [Savoy MG 12014], and The Charlie Parker Story [Savoy MG 12079]) completing the reissue of the previously released master takes, and the original issue of most of the unreleased takes from these seven sessions. Parker's entire Savoy ouvre was finally issued on Charlie Parker: The Complete Savoy Studio Sessions in 1978.

Track listing
Multiple takes may be combined into a single LP track, these are reflected in the listings below. Names of the takes are as listed in the liner notes of the album. Previously released takes are shown in boldface.

Personnel
 Charlie Parker – alto saxophone
 Miles Davis – trumpet
 Bud Powell – piano (track B7)
 Duke Jordan – piano (tracks A1-A3)
 John Lewis – piano (tracks A4-A6, B1-B6)
 Tommy Potter – double bass (tracks A1-A3, B7)
 Curley Russell – double bass (tracks A4-A6, B1-B6)
 Max Roach – drums

Notes

References

1956 albums
Charlie Parker albums
Savoy Records albums
Albums produced by Teddy Reig